Gotoda (written: 後藤田) is a Japanese surname. Notable people with the surname include:

 – real name Yuki Gotoda (後藤田 由紀), Japanese actress
, Japanese politician 

Japanese-language surnames